Shraman Jain (also known as Srman Jain) is an Indian actor who works mainly in the Indian Television circuit. Jain is known for his roles in Adaalat, Saas Bina Sasural, Chhanchhan, Dadagiri and Comedy Classes.

Before acting in Adaalat he was known for portraying "Pracheen" in Saas Bina Sasural. He played the Shraman, assistant of main protagonist Ronit Roy in Adaalat.

Jain made his film debut with Desi Boyz. He also played the role of Mohit in the Star Plus popular show Mere Angne Mein. He was last seen in the SAB TV show Trideviyaan.

Besides acting in films he also produced a Marathi film titled Janiva. This film is the debut film of Vaibhavi Shandilya.

References

External links

Living people
21st-century Indian male actors
Indian male film actors
Year of birth missing (living people)